Galindo Aznárez II (died 922) was Count of Aragon from 893 to 922. He was the son of Aznar Galíndez II and his wife Onneca Garcés, daughter of King García Íñiguez of Pamplona.

Life
Galindo succeeded his father as count of Aragon. In 905 he was part of a coalition that sponsored a coup d'état in Pamplona in favor of his brother-in-law, Sancho I, that overthrew the ruling Íñiguez dynasty which was replaced by the Jiménez dynasty, another branch that was more favorable to the interests of Aragon. However, he turned on this new king and in 911 attacked him in concert with brother-in-law Muhammad al-Tawil and Abd Allah ibn Lubb al-Qasawi. This coalition was defeated, al-Tawil killed, and Galindo forced to become vassal of Sancho.

Marriages and issue
Galindo was married twice. By his first wife, Acibella, daughter of Count García II Sánchez of Gascony, and his wife Amuna of Périgord, he had three children:
 Toda Galíndez, married to Bernat I, Count of Ribagorza, to whom she brought Sobrarbe.
 Redemptus Galíndez, bishop.
 Mirón Galíndez, who probably died before his father since he did not inherit the county in spite of being a legitimate son.

By his second wife, Sancha Garcés of Pamplona, daughter of García Jiménez and Onneca Rebelle of Sangüesa, and half-sister of Sancho I, he had:
 Andregoto Galíndez, who inherited the Aragonese county. She was queen of Pamplona by her marriage with her first cousin García Sanchez, king of Pamplona (925–970).  
 Velasquita Galíndez, first married Íñigo López de Estigi y Ciligueta. She could also have been the wife of Count Fortún Jiménez of Aragon ( 943–958).
 
Galindo also sired several illegitimate sons: Guntislo, Sancho, Belasco, Banzo—father of a Galindo—and Aznar.

References

Bibliography

 
 
 
 
 

922 deaths
Counts of Aragon
9th-century births